Menippus of Stratonikeia ( Menippos o Stratonikevs, lived 1st century BC), surnamed Catocas, was a Carian by birth, born in the city of Stratonicea. He was the most accomplished orator of his time in all Asia (79 BC). Cicero, who heard him, puts him almost on a level with the Attic orators.

References
Smith, William (editor); Dictionary of Greek and Roman Biography and Mythology, "Menippus (3)", Boston, (1867)

Notes

  

Ancient Greek rhetoricians
1st-century BC people
Roman Caria
Year of birth unknown
Year of death unknown